Brignoliella is a genus of araneomorph spiders in the family Tetrablemmidae that was first described by W. A. Shear in 1978.

Species
 it contains twenty-four species, found in Asia, on Fiji, in Papua New Guinea, Kiribati, and on New Caledonia:
Brignoliella acuminata (Simon, 1889) (type) – New Caledonia
Brignoliella beattyi Shear, 1978 – Caroline Is.
Brignoliella besuchetiana Bourne, 1980 – India
Brignoliella besutensis Lin, Li & Jäger, 2012 – Malaysia, SIngapore
Brignoliella bicornis (Simon, 1893) – Philippines
Brignoliella caligiformis Tong & Li, 2008 – China
Brignoliella carmen Lehtinen, 1981 – Philippines
Brignoliella dankobiensis Bourne, 1980 – Papua New Guinea (New Ireland)
Brignoliella delphina Deeleman-Reinhold, 1980 – New Guinea
Brignoliella klabati Lehtinen, 1981 – Indonesia (Sulawesi)
Brignoliella leletina Bourne, 1980 – Papua New Guinea (New Ireland)
Brignoliella maoganensis Tong & Li, 2008 – China
Brignoliella maros Lehtinen, 1981 – Indonesia (Sulawesi)
Brignoliella martensi (Brignoli, 1972) – Nepal
Brignoliella massai Lehtinen, 1981 – Indonesia (Sulawesi)
Brignoliella michaeli Lehtinen, 1981 – Malaysia, Singapore
Brignoliella patmae Fardiansah & Dupérré, 2019 – Indonesia (Sumatra)
Brignoliella quadricornis (Roewer, 1963) – Caroline Is.
Brignoliella ratnapura Shear, 1988 – Sri Lanka
Brignoliella sarawak Shear, 1978 – Borneo
Brignoliella scrobiculata (Simon, 1893) – Sri Lanka
Brignoliella trifida Lehtinen, 1981 – Borneo
Brignoliella vitiensis Lehtinen, 1981 – Fiji
Brignoliella vulgaris Lehtinen, 1981 – Borneo

See also
 List of Tetrablemmidae species

References

Araneomorphae genera
Spiders of Asia
Tetrablemmidae